Matzah, matzo,  or maẓẓah (pl. matzot or Ashk. matzos) is an unleavened flatbread that is part of Jewish cuisine and forms an integral element of the Passover festival, during which chametz (leaven and five grains that, per Jewish Law, are self-leavening) is forbidden.

As the Torah recounts, God commanded the Israelites (modernly, Jews and Samaritans) to eat only unleavened bread during the seven-day Passover festival. Matzah can be either soft like a pita or crispy. Only the crispy variety is produced commercially because soft matzah has a very short shelf life.  Matzah meal is crispy matzah that has been ground to a flour-like consistency. Matzah meal is used to make matzah balls (kneidles/kneidlach), the principal ingredient of matzah ball soup (kneidlach soup). Sephardic Jews typically cook with matzah itself rather than matzah meal.

Matzah that is kosher for Passover is limited in Ashkenazi tradition to plain matzah made from flour and water.  The flour may be whole grain or refined grain, but must be made from one of five grains:  wheat, spelt, barley, rye, or oat. Some Sephardic communities allow matzah to be made with eggs and/or fruit juice to be used throughout the holiday.

Biblical sources
Matzah is mentioned in the Torah several times in relation to The Exodus from Egypt:

Religious significance
There are numerous explanations behind the symbolism of matzah. One is historical: Passover is a commemoration of the exodus from Egypt. The biblical narrative relates that the Israelites left Egypt in such haste they could not wait for their bread dough to rise; the bread, when baked, was matzah. (Exodus 12:39). The other reason for eating matzah is symbolic: On the one hand, matzah symbolizes redemption and freedom, but it is also lechem oni, "poor man's bread". Thus it serves as a reminder to be humble, and to not forget what life was like in servitude. Also, leaven symbolizes corruption and pride as leaven "puffs up". Eating the "bread of affliction" is both a lesson in humility and an act that enhances the appreciation of freedom.

Another explanation is that matzah has been used to replace the pesach, or the traditional Passover offering that was made before the destruction of the Temple. During the Seder the third time the matzah is eaten it is preceded with the Sephardic rite, "zekher l'korban pesach hane'ekhal al hasova". This means "remembrance of the Passover offering, eaten while full". This last piece of the matzah eaten is called afikoman and many explain it as a symbol of salvation in the future.

The Passover Seder meal is full of symbols of salvation, including the closing line, "Next year in Jerusalem," but the use of matzah is the oldest symbol of salvation in the Seder.

Ingredients

At the Passover seder, simple matzah made of flour and water is mandatory.  Sephardic tradition additionally permits the inclusion of eggs in the recipe. The flour must be ground from one of the five grains specified in Jewish law for Passover matzah: wheat, barley, spelt, rye or oat. Per Ashkenazic tradition, matzah made with wine, fruit juice, onion, garlic, etc., is not acceptable for use at any time during the Passover festival except by the elderly or unwell.

Non-Passover matzah may be made with onion, garlic, poppy seed, etc.  It can even be made from rice, maize, buckwheat and other non-traditional flours that can never be used for Passover matzah.

Gluten-free preparations 
Some manufacturers produce gluten-free matzah-lookalike made from potato starch, tapioca, and other non-traditional flour to market to those who cannot safely eat gluten, such as those with coeliac disease. The Orthodox Union states that these gluten-free products may be eaten on Passover, but that they do not fulfill the commandment (mitzvah) of eating matzah at the Seder, because matzah must be made from one of the five grains (wheat, barley, oat, spelt, and rye).

The only one of the five grains that does not contain gluten is oat, but the resulting matzah would be gluten-free only if there were no cross-contamination with gluten-containing grains. In recent years, matzah manufacturers have begun producing gluten-free oat matzah certified kosher for Passover. Additionally, some authorities have expressed doubt about whether oat is properly listed among the five grains, or whether it resulted from a historical mistranslation. Therefore, some have suggested baking matzah from a mixture of 90% rice flour and 10% wheat flour, for those who can handle eating the small amount of wheat in this mixture. For those who can eat no wheat, eating oat matzah at the Seder is still considered the best option.

Preparation

Matzah dough is quickly mixed and rolled out without an autolyse step as used for leavened breads. Most forms are pricked with a fork or a similar tool to keep the finished product from puffing up, and the resulting flat piece of dough is cooked at high temperature until it develops dark spots, then set aside to cool and, if sufficiently thin, to harden to crispness.  Dough is considered to begin the leavening process 18 minutes from the time it gets wet; sooner if eggs, fruit juice, or milk is added to the dough. The entire process of making matzah takes only a few minutes in efficient modern matzah bakeries.

After baking, matzah may be ground into fine crumbs, known as matzah meal.  Matzah meal can be used like flour during the week of Passover when flour can otherwise be used only to make matzah.

Variations

There are two major forms of matzah. In many western countries the most common form is the hard form of matzah which is cracker-like in appearance and taste and is used in all Ashkenazic and most Sephardic communities. Yemenite and Iraqi Jews traditionally made a form of soft matzah which looks like Greek pita or like a tortilla. Soft matzah is made only by hand, and generally with shmurah flour.

Flavored varieties of matzah are produced commercially, such as poppy seed- or onion-flavored. Oat and spelt matzah with kosher certification are produced.  Oat matzah is generally suitable for those who cannot eat gluten.  Whole wheat, bran and organic matzah are also available. Chocolate-covered matzah is a favorite among children, although some consider it "enriched matzah" and will not eat it during the Passover holiday. A quite different flat confection of chocolate and nuts that resembles matzah is sometimes called "chocolate matzah".

Matzah contains typically 111 calories per 1-ounce/28g (USDA Nutrient Database), about the same as rye crispbread.

Shmurah matzah
Shĕmura ("guarded") matzah ( matsa shĕmura) is made from grain that has been under special supervision from the time it was harvested to ensure that no fermentation has occurred, and that it is suitable for eating on the first night of Passover. (Shĕmura wheat may be formed into either handmade or machine-made matzah, while non-shĕmura wheat is only used for machine-made matzah. It is possible to hand-bake matzah in shĕmura style from non-shmurah flour—this is a matter of style, it is not actually in any way shĕmura—but such matzah has rarely been produced since the introduction of machine-made matzah.)

Haredi Judaism is scrupulous about the supervision of matzah and have the custom of baking their own or at least participating in some stage of the baking process. Rabbi Haim Halberstam of Sanz ruled that machine-made matzah were chametz.  According to that opinion, handmade non-shmurah matzah may be used on the eighth day of Passover outside of the Holy Land. However the non-Hasidic Haredi community of Jerusalem follows the custom that machine-made matzah may be used, with preference to the use of shĕmurah flour, in accordance with the ruling of Rabbi Yosef Haim Sonnenfeld, who ruled that machine-made matzah may be preferable to hand made in some cases. The commentators to the Shulhan `Aruch record that it is the custom of some of Diaspora Jewry to be scrupulous in giving Hallah from the dough used for baking "Matzat Mitzvah" (the shĕmurah matzah eaten during Passover) to a Kohen child to eat.

Egg matzah
In Ashkenazi tradition, the requirement for eating Matzah at the Seder cannot be fulfilled "with [egg] matza." Egg matzah at the seder is not a problem in Sephardic tradition, if it is customary in the community.

"Egg (sometimes enriched) matzah" are matzaht usually made with fruit juice, often grape juice or apple juice, instead of water, but not necessarily with eggs themselves.  There is a custom among some Ashkenazi Jews not to eat them during Passover, except for the elderly, infirm, or children, who cannot digest plain matzah; these matzaht are considered to be kosher for Passover if prepared otherwise properly. The issue of whether egg matzah is allowed for Passover comes down to whether there is a difference between the various liquids that can be used.  Water facilitates a fermentation of grain flour specifically into what is defined as chametz, but the question is whether fruit juice, eggs, honey, oil or milk are also deemed to do so within the strict definitions of Jewish laws regarding chametz.

The Talmud, Pesachim 35a, states that liquid food extracts do not cause flour to leaven the way that water does.  According to this view, flour mixed with other liquids would not need to be treated with the same care as flour mixed with water. The Tosafot (commentaries) explain that such liquids only produce a leavening reaction within flour if they themselves have had water added to them and otherwise the dough they produce is completely permissible for consumption during Passover, whether or not made according to the laws applying to matzaht.

As a result, Joseph ben Ephraim Karo, author of the Shulchan Aruch or "Code of Jewish Law" (Orach Chayim 462:4) granted blanket permission for the use of any matzah made from non-water-based dough, including egg matzah, on Passover. Many egg matzah boxes no longer include the message, "Ashkenazi custom is that egg matzah is only allowed for children, elderly and the infirm during Passover." Even amongst those who consider that enriched matzaht may not be eaten during Passover, it is permissible to retain it in the home.

Chocolate-covered matzah
Chocolate-covered matzah was sold in boxes as a standard product, alongside boxes of egg matzah.

The matzah itself is not Hamotzi (meaning that it is Mezonot).

Cooking with matzah 

Matzah may be used whole, broken, chopped ("matzah farfel"), or finely ground ("matzah meal") to make numerous matzah-based cooked dishes. These include matzah balls, which are traditionally served in chicken soup; matzah brei, a dish of Ashkenazi origin made from matzah soaked in water, mixed with beaten egg, and fried; helzel, poultry neck skin stuffed with matzah meal; matzah pizza, in which the piece of matzah takes the place of pizza crust and is topped with melted cheese and sauce; and kosher for Passover cakes and cookies, which are made with matzah meal or a finer variety called "cake meal" that gives them a denser texture than ordinary baked foods made with flour. Hasidic Jews do not cook with matzah, believing that mixing it with water may allow leavening; this stringency is known as gebrochts. However, Jews who avoid eating gebrochts will eat cooked matzah dishes on the eighth day of Passover outside the Land of Israel, as the eighth day is of rabbinic and not Torah origin.

In Christianity
Communion wafers used by the Roman Catholic Church as well as in some Protestant traditions for the Eucharist are flat, unleavened bread. The main reason for the use of this bread is the belief that, because the last supper was described in the Synoptic Gospels as a Passover meal, the unleavened matzah bread was used by Jesus when he held it up and said "this is my body". All Byzantine Rite churches use leavened bread for the Eucharist as this symbolizes the risen Christ.

Some Oriental Orthodox and Eastern Catholic Christians use leavened bread, as in the east there is the tradition, based upon the gospel of John, that leavened bread was on the table of the Last Supper. In the Armenian Apostolic Church, the Ethiopian Orthodox Tewahedo Church and Eritrean Orthodox Tewahedo Church, unleavened bread called qǝddus qurban in Ge'ez, the liturgical language of the Eritreans and Ethiopians, is used for communion.

Saint Thomas Christians living on the Malabar coast of Kerala, India have the customary celebration of Pesaha in their homes. On the evening before Good Friday, Pesaha bread is made at home. It is made with unleavened flour and they consume a sweet drink made up of coconut milk and jaggery along with this bread. On the Pesaha night, the bread is baked (steamed) immediately after rice flour is mixed with water and they pierce it many times with handle of the spoon to let out steam so that the bread will not rise (this custom is called "juthante kannu kuthal" in the Malayalam language meaning "piercing the bread according to the custom of Jews"). This bread is cut by the head of the family and shared among the family members.

World War II
At the end of World War II, the National Jewish Welfare Board had a matzah factory (according to the American Jewish Historical Society, it was probably the Manischewitz matzah factory in New Jersey) produce matzah in the form of a giant "V" for "Victory", for shipment to military bases overseas and in the U.S., for Passover seders for Jewish military personnel. Passover in 1945 began on 1 April, when the collapse of the Axis in Europe was clearly imminent; Nazi Germany surrendered five weeks later.

In film

 is the story of the last family-owned matzah bakery in America during their final year at their historic New York City factory.

References

External links

Manischewitz Matzah Products
 Rabbi Eliezer Melamed, Shemura Matza in Peninei Halakha

 
Israeli cuisine
Jewish cuisine
Passover foods
Hebrew words and phrases in Jewish prayers and blessings
Positive Mitzvoth